Charles Allen Lechmere (5 October 1849 – 23 December 1920), also known as Charles Allen Cross, was an English meat cart driver. A native of east London, Lechmere reportedly worked for the Pickfords company for more than 20 years, during which time he was primarily known as Charles Cross. On 31 August 1888, Lechmere reported the body of Mary Ann Nichols, the first of Jack the Ripper's five canonical victims, while on his way to work. Although long regarded as merely a witness to the crime scene, Lechmere has since been named as a potential Jack the Ripper suspect by contemporary true crime writers.

The suggestion that he might actually be the Whitechapel Murderer was first raised by Derek Osborne in 2000 in an issue of the magazine Ripperana. The following year saw the possibility further explored in an article by John Carey, while Osborne went on to examine a set of remarkable coincidences which suggested that 'Cross' was in fact a man legally known as Lechmere. Lechmere's possible guilt was further discussed by John Carey in 2002; by Osborne in 2007, and by Michael Connor in four issues of The Ripperologist between 2006 and 2008.

Mainstream awareness of Lechmere grew in 2014 when journalist Christer Holmgren and criminologist Gareth Norris explored the case against him in the 2014 Channel Five documentary Jack the Ripper: The Missing Evidence. In 2021, Holmgren produced a book in which Lechmere is linked not only to the Whitechapel Murders, but also to the longer series of killings known as the Thames Torso Murders.

Biography 
Charles Lechmere was born on 5 October 1849. His birth was registered under the Strand, London, England, but that was the registrar's office, not his place of birth. He was the son of John Allen Lechmere and Maria Louisa Roulson. Charles Lechmere had a "broken home" growing up, having had two stepfathers and never knowing his real father. Lechmere's childhood was also characterized by instability of residence, as he was raised in a series of different homes. Lechmere married Elizabeth Bostock in 1870 and had eleven children, two of whom died young. Lechmere died in December 1920 at the age of seventy-one.

Involvement in the Whitechapel murders 
In Lechmere's testimony to the Nichols inquest, he claimed that he was walking to work down Buck's Row at around 3:40 a.m when he discovered the body of Mary Ann "Polly" Nichols lying next to a gateway. According to a press report Robert Paul, who was walking some distance behind, first noticed him standing 'where the woman was' but in reports of his inquest testimony Paul said he saw him 'in the middle of the road'. After he saw Paul, Lechmere brought him over to look at the woman. No blood was described by either man, but by the time a constable (PC Neil) found Nichols shortly afterwards, blood was oozing from her throat (according to the evidence at the inquest). Some theorists suggest that the cut to her throat was very fresh when Lechmere and Paul were present. Modern forensics, however, show this claim to be false and that blood can ooze from such a wound for up to two hours after death. In addition, neither man reported seeing or hearing anyone else at Buck's Row, which had no side exits.

Jack the Ripper suspect 
The theory suggests that Lechmere may have murdered Nichols and begun mutilating her body when he suddenly heard the sound of Paul's footsteps; he then rapidly pulled down her clothing to cover up her wounds and portrayed himself as the discoverer of the body. However, both Lechmere and Paul testified that they were together and tried to pull down the clothing. As Paul and Lechmere were both late for work they continued to work intending to notify the next PC they found. PC Mizen was reported as saying that Lechmere told him, "You are wanted in Buck's row by a policeman; a woman is lying there." PC Neil was at the scene when PC Mizen arrived but Lechmere had no way of knowing that. Some newspapers reported that instead Lechmere had said, "You're wanted down there (pointing to Buck's Row)." A 2014 TV documentary also points out that Lechmere did not appear at the inquest until after Paul had been quoted in the press to the effect that another man had been present. What if didn't say was that Lechmere appeared at the second day of the inquest whereas Paul had to be rousted out of bed by the police for interviewing and didn't appear until two weeks later. At the inquest, Lechmere gave his name as Cross, which was the surname of a long-dead police constable stepfather; later investigators found that no-one named Cross was listed in the census records for the address he supplied, meaning that his true identity was a mystery for well over a century. Lechmere appears to have used his stepfather's name, Cross, for about 20 years in his employment. He did give his address and place of employment to the inquest.

The locations of Lechmere's home, family and place of work put him in the vicinity of several 'Ripper' murders and other, extra-canonical killings besides. Holmgren uses the argument that geographic profiling, developed decades after the Ripper murders, can help narrow down likely suspects by analyzing their established movements and habitual locations in comparison to crime scenes. Criminals tend to strike in areas that are not too close to home, yet with which they are somewhat familiar and comfortable. Given this data, Holmgren argues Lechmere is the most plausible suspect for the Ripper murders. Lechmere's logical shortest routes to work—one passing down Hanbury Street, the other down Old Montague Street—would have Lechmere pass nearby streets around the same times as Martha Tabram, Polly Nichols, and arguably Annie Chapman were murdered. The murders of Elizabeth Stride and Catherine Eddowes on the same night (the so-called "Double Event") took place further south—and in the small hours of a Sunday, likely the only day Lechmere would not have been travelling from home to work. Stride was killed in proximity to his mother's house and in the area he grew up in; the locality in which Eddowes was murdered would have been well known to him, as it was on the logical route to Broad Street from at least one of his earlier addresses. However, Holmgren fails to state that the Geographical Profiling applied to the Jack the Ripper case by Kim Rossmo puts the likely abode of the killer as in the area of Thrawl Street and Flower and Dean Street which is nowhere near Lechmere's home in Doveton Street.

Mary Jane Kelly was murdered near the northernmost route to his work, and the time frame in which she is estimated to have been killed is reconcilable with his presumed journey, although the day she was killed was a holiday and he may have had the day off work.

References 

 

1849 births
1920 deaths
Jack the Ripper suspects